Castelfranco Emilia is a town and comune   in Modena, Emilia-Romagna, north-central Italy.

Castelfranco either occupies or lies near the site of the ancient Forum Gallorum, a place on the via Aemilia between Modena and Bologna. Near the town, on 14 April 43 BC, Octavian and Hirtius defeated Mark Antony in a battle during the War of Mutina. The village never gained prominence in ancient times. While it was included in the Tabula Peutingeriana, it was omitted from all other Roman road itineraries. 

A fortress was built just outside the town in 1628–34 by Pope Urban VIII as a northern defensive bastion for the Papal States. By the late 19th century, the fortress had been converted to a prison. In 1861 it was joined with the former comune of Piumazzo. This town is home of the tortellini, a typical Italian food. In this region lambrusco wine is also produced. The church of Santa Maria Assunta houses Assumption of the Virgin by Guido Reni.

People
 Alfonsina Strada, the only woman ever to compete in the male Giro d'Italia (1924)
 Valerio Massimo Manfredi, historian, archaeologist and journalist (1943)
 Cécile Kyenge, Italian-Congolese politician and current Member of the European Parliament (1983)

Twin towns
 Marktredwitz, Germany, since 1997

Sources

Cities and towns in Emilia-Romagna